The 1989 Air Force Falcons football team represented the United States Air Force Academy in the 1989 NCAA Division I-A football season. In the Ram–Falcon Trophy match, the Falcons beat the Colorado State Rams to win the trophy.

Schedule

Personnel

Season summary

San Diego State
Dee Dowis 13 Rush, 249 Yds, 6 TD

Wyoming

at Northwestern

UTEP

at Colorado State

at Navy

Notre Dame

Awards and honors
Dee Dowis
Honorable Mention All-American (AP)
WAC Offensive Player of the Year
6th in Heisman Trophy voting

Lance McDowell
Bullard Award

References

Air Force
Air Force Falcons football seasons
Air Force Falcons football